The 2015–16 season of the Algerian Men's Volleyball League was the 54th annual season of the country's highest volleyball level.

Members of the Algerian Men's Volleyball League (2015–16 season)

Regular season E

|}

POULE E

Round 1

|}

Round 2

|}

Round 3

|}

Round 4

|}

Round 5

|}

Round 6

|}

Round 7

|}

Round 8

|}

Round 9

|}

Round 10

|}

Round 11

|}

Round 12

|}

Round 13

|}

Round 14

|}

Regular season F

|}

POULE F

Round 1

|}

Round 2

|}

Round 3

|}

Round 4

|}

Round 5

|}

Round 6

|}

Round 7

|}

Round 8

|}

Round 9

|}

Round 10

|}

Round 11

|}

Round 12

|}

Round 13

|}

Round 14

|}

Awards

References

External links
 Algerian Men's Volleyball League 2015/2016
 Volleyball in Algeria

Volleyball competitions in Algeria
2015 in volleyball
2016 in volleyball
2015 in Algerian sport
2016 in Algerian sport